Oksana Grishina (also spelled Oxana Grichina) (born 27 November 1968, Tula, Russia) is a Russian track cyclist.

Grishina competed 1996 Summer Olympics in Atlanta where she came 5th in the women's sprint event. She also competed at the 2000 Summer Olympics in Sydney where she won a silver medal in the women's sprint event and came 15th in the women's track time trial events.

References

External links
Profile at DatabaseOlympics.com
Profile at Radsportseiten.com

1968 births
Living people
Russian female cyclists
Cyclists at the 1996 Summer Olympics
Cyclists at the 2000 Summer Olympics
Olympic cyclists of Russia
Olympic silver medalists for Russia
Olympic medalists in cycling
Sportspeople from Tula, Russia
UCI Track Cycling World Champions (women)
Russian track cyclists
Medalists at the 2000 Summer Olympics